Bistorta vivipara (synonym Persicaria vivipara) is a perennial herbaceous flowering plant in the knotweed and buckwheat family Polygonaceae, commonly known as alpine bistort. Scientific synonyms include Bistorta vivipara and Polygonum viviparum. It is common all over the high Arctic through Europe,  North America, and temperate and tropical Asia. Its range stretches further south in high mountainous areas such as the Alps, Carpathians, Pyrenees, Caucasus, Alaska and the Tibetan Plateau.

Taxonomy
Molecular phylogenetic work has demonstrated  that the genus Bistorta represents a distinct lineage within the family Polygonaceae. The genus Bistorta contains at least 42 accepted species.

Description

It has a thick rhizomatous rootstock and an erect, unbranched, hairless stem. The leaves are hairless on the upper surfaces, but hairy and greyish-green below. The basal ones are longish-elliptical with long stalks and rounded bases; the upper ones are few and are linear and stalkless. The tiny flowers are white or pink in the upper part of the spike with five perianth segments, eight stamens with purple anthers and three fused carpels. The lower ones are replaced by bulbils. Flowers rarely produce viable seeds and reproduction is normally by the bulbils, which are small bulb-like structures that develop in the axils of the leaves and may develop into new plants. Very often, a small leaf develops when the bulbil is still attached to the mother plant. The bulbils are rich in starch and are a preferred food for rock ptarmigans (Lagopus mutus) and reindeer; they are also occasionally used by Arctic peoples. Alpine bistort flowers in June and July.

Habitat
Alpine bistort grows in many different plant communities, very often in abundance. Typical habitats include moist short grassland, yards, the edges of tracks, and nutrient-rich fens.

As with many other alpine plants, Alpine bistort is slow-growing and produces embryonic buds one year that  grow and open a few years after their formation, with an individual leaf or inflorescence taking three to four years to reach maturity from the time the buds are formed.

Mycorrhiza
Alpine bistort has been shown to form an ectomycorrhizal root symbiosis with fungi.

Uses 
The bulbils can be stripped from the lower flower stalks and eaten raw. The young roots are edible raw, while older ones must be cooked. The young leaves can be eaten raw or cooked.

The roots are eaten in Russia, especially by the Samoyed peoples.

In place names
The Kokolik River in Alaska is named after Qaqalik, the Inuit name for alpine bistort.

References 

vivipara
Alpine flora
Edible plants
Flora of Central Asia
Flora of Central Europe
Flora of Eastern Asia
Flora of Eastern Canada
Flora of Eastern Europe
Flora of Indo-China
Flora of Northern Europe
Flora of Siberia
Flora of Southeastern Europe
Flora of Southwestern Europe
Flora of Subarctic America
Flora of the North-Central United States
Flora of the Northeastern United States
Flora of the Northwestern United States
Flora of the Russian Far East
Flora of the South-Central United States
Flora of the Southwestern United States
Flora of Western Canada
Plants described in 1753
Taxa named by Carl Linnaeus
Flora without expected TNC conservation status